Helen DeWitt (born 1957) is an American novelist. She is the author of the novels The Last Samurai (2000) and Lightning Rods (2011) and the short story collection Some Trick (2018) and, in collaboration with the Australian journalist Ilya Gridneff, has written
Your Name Here. She lives in Berlin.

Life

DeWitt grew up primarily in Latin America (Mexico, Brazil, Colombia and Ecuador), as her parents worked in the United States diplomatic service. After a year at Northfield Mount Hermon School and two short periods at Smith College, DeWitt studied classics at the University of Oxford, first at Lady Margaret Hall, and then at Brasenose College for her D.Phil., where her thesis examined the concept of propriety in ancient literary criticism. Afterwards she became a junior research fellow at Somerville College.

Work

DeWitt is best known for her debut novel, The Last Samurai. She held a variety of jobs while struggling to finish a book, including dictionary text tagger, copytaker, Dunkin' Donuts employee, legal secretary, and working at a laundry service. During this time she reportedly attempted to finish many novels, before finally completing The Last Samurai, her 50th manuscript, in 1998. It was published in 2000 by Talk Miramax Books.

In 1999, DeWitt had completed another novel, Lightning Rods, and later signed a contract for it with Miramax Books in 2003, but it remained unpublished and in limbo. After Miramax Books was folded into Hyperion Books in late 2007, she asked for the rights to be returned. It was eventually published in 2011 by New Directions.

In 2005 she collaborated with Ingrid Kerma, the London-based painter, writing "limit5" for the exhibition "Blushing Brides".
 
An excerpt from an in-progress novel set in Flin Flon, Manitoba, has been published online by Open Book: Ontario at the end of an article about the novel and DeWitt's difficulties in finding a publisher.

Her short story "Climbers", which explores artistic ideals and commercial realities of the writing life, was published in Harper's magazine November 2014.

In 2018, a collection of thirteen of her short stories, Some Trick, was published by New Directions. It was shortlisted for the 2019 PEN/Robert W. Bingham Prize.

DeWitt published a novella, The English Understand Wool, in 2022. The novella was published as part of a new series from New Directions Publishing, "Storybook ND", which aims to deliver "the pleasure one felt as a child reading a marvelous book from cover to cover in an afternoon".

Bibliography

Novels and novellas 
 The Last Samurai (Talk Miramax Books/Chatto & Windus, 2000)
Your Name Here (co-written with Ilya Gridneff). Was available for purchase as a PDF from DeWitt's website at one time, but remains otherwise unpublished.
 Lightning Rods (New Directions, 2011; And Other Stories, 2012)
 The English Understand Wool (New Directions, 2022)

Short stories 
 Some Trick:  Thirteen Stories (New York: New Directions, 2018)

References

External links 
 
 Helen DeWitt’s First Time | The Paris Review (YouTube)

1957 births
American expatriates in Brazil
American expatriates in Germany
American expatriates in Mexico
20th-century American novelists
Living people
Novelists from Maryland
Smith College alumni
Alumni of Brasenose College, Oxford
Fellows of Somerville College, Oxford
21st-century American novelists
People from Takoma Park, Maryland
American women novelists
20th-century American women writers
21st-century American women writers
Northfield Mount Hermon School alumni
Alumni of Lady Margaret Hall, Oxford